Gunnilse IS is a Swedish football club located in Angered, a suburb of Gothenburg.

Background
Since their foundation on 16 September 1950 Gunnilse IS has participated mainly in the middle and lower divisions of the Swedish football league system.  The club currently (2012) plays in Division 2 Västra Götaland which is the fourth tier of Swedish football. Their best achievement was in 2000 when they played one season in the Superettan. They play their home matches at the Hjällbovallen, in Angered, Gothenburg.

Gunnilse IS are affiliated to the Göteborgs Fotbollförbund.

Season to season

Current squad
As of 1 January 2010:

Achievements

League
 Division 1 Västra:
 Runners-up (1): 1992

External links
 Gunnilse IS – Official Website

Footnotes

 
Association football clubs established in 1950
1950 establishments in Sweden